Majid Latif Rasulov (1916–1993) - Azerbaijani scientist, academician (1983), physics-mathematics PhD (1960)

Biography 

Majid Latif Rasulov was born in Shaki in 1916. Academic M.L. Rasulov died on February 11, 1993, in Baku.

Achievements 

Majid Rasulov who graduated from Azerbaijan State University (Baku State University) which was postgraduate. He was prominent specialist about mathematical-physics equations and he had worked at functional analysis sections. His researches are divided 4 directions:
First direction consist of equation which is differential equation which gives special solution of Koshi issues, contour integral. At spectral theory works is concerned second direction . There he proved new formulas for differential equation, contour integral. In third direction-To keep linear functional norm which is determined in Banach space, its continuation was proved by solitariness condition. Lastly in fourth direction, normality condition of linear differential operators was extracted.
In 1960, M.L. Rasulov was awarded "Doctor Nauk" degree  in the Scientific  Council of Mathematics University. 
"Method of contour integration" monograph was written by Majid Rasulov and it was published in 1964 in Moscow. Prof. A.I. Ivanov was editor of monograph. He wrote in this review: "M. Rasulov's monograph is exceptional event. There isn't like as this book in Earth press." In 1967 "Method of contour integration" monograph was translated to English language by order of England Mathematics Society and it was published in Canada, USA, Netherlands. 
He was rewarded some order, medals and "Figure Scientist" (honorary title) was given him in 1980.

1916 births
1993 deaths
20th-century Azerbaijani mathematicians
Soviet mathematicians